Virginia is a locality in the Northern Territory of Australia located about  south east of the Darwin CBD. Its Local Government Area is the Litchfield Municipality. The suburb is mostly a rural area, but has been experiencing strong growth in population and development. Settlement of the suburb began in 1869, after George McLachlan surveyed the small satellite town. Virginia has been used as a name for the area since the 1870s.

References

External links
 https://web.archive.org/web/20110629040718/http://www.nt.gov.au/lands/lis/placenames/origins/greaterdarwin.shtml#v

Suburbs of Darwin, Northern Territory